Qeydu (also Romanized as Qeydū; also known as Ghidoo, Kaidu, Kāydū, Key Dū, and Qedu) is a village in Galehzan Rural District, in the Central District of Khomeyn County, Markazi Province, Iran. At the 2006 census, its population was 301, in 100 families.

References 

Populated places in Khomeyn County